Embrich is a surname. Notable people with the surname include:

Erik Embrich (born 1997), Finnish ice hockey player
Irina Embrich (born 1980), Estonian fencer